Patricia Beer (4 November 1919 – 15 August 1999) was an English poet and critic.

Biography
She was born in Exmouth, Devon into a family of Plymouth Brethren. Her mother died when she was fourteen and it affected her entire life and the way she saw death. Patricia Beer was strongly influenced by the Plymouth Brethren Church, a loosely structured, fundamentalist sect. She attended Exmouth Grammar School before reading English at Exeter University. Beer moved away from her religious background as a young adult, becoming a teacher and academic. She took her B.Litt at the University of Oxford following which she spent seven years in Italy where she taught English Literature at the University of Padua, the British Institute and the Ministero Aeronautica in Rome.

She began to write poetry after World War II, while living in Italy; she is most often classified as a 'New Romantic' poet comparable to John Heath-Stubbs. On her own account, however, there is a discontinuity in her work. Devon is a major presence. Beer returned to England in 1953 where she became Senior Lecturer in English at Goldsmiths' College at the University of London (1962-1968). From the later 1960s she wrote full-time. She edited several significant anthologies, broadcast, and contributed to literary reviews.

She was married twice; first in 1960 to the writer P. N. Furbank, and then in 1964 to John Damien Parsons, an architect, settling in Upottery, near Honiton, England.

Works
Loss of the Magyar, and other poems (1959)
The Survivors (1963) poems
Just Like the Resurrection (1967) poems
Mrs. Beer's House (1968) autobiography
The Estuary (1971) poems
An Introduction to the Metaphysical Poets (1972)
Reader: I Married Him (1974) criticism
Driving West (1975)
Moon's Ottery (1978)
Selected Poems (1979)
The Lie of the Land (1983)
Collected Poems (1988) poems
Friend of Heraclitus (1993)
Autumn (1997) poems
Abbey Tomb (date unknown)
The Lost Woman (1983)
The Fifth Sense (date unknown)

References

External links
 Patricia Beer - 1924-1999 Accessed 2009-12-27
 Obituary (The Guardian): Patricia Beer Accessed 2015-02-09
 Obituary (The Independent): Patricia Beer Accessed 2009-12-27
 Portrait of Patricia Beer (dry-point by George Adamson RE) 
 Patricia Beer, literary and personal papers at the University of Exeter

English women poets
1919 births
1999 deaths
People from Exmouth
20th-century English women writers
20th-century English poets
English literary critics
Women literary critics
English women non-fiction writers
Alumni of the University of Exeter
Academic staff of the University of Padua
Academics of Goldsmiths, University of London
Alumni of the University of Oxford
British expatriates in Italy